Aleksandr Aseledchenko (born 18 October 1973) is a retired Russian triple jumper.

He finished fourth at the 1996 European Indoor Championships and won the bronze medal at the 1997 World Indoor Championships.

References

1973 births
Living people
Russian male triple jumpers
20th-century Russian people